Kaij Assembly constituency is one of the 288 Vidhan Sabha (legislative assembly) constituencies of Maharashtra state in western India.

Overview
Kaij (constituency number 232) is one of the six Vidhan Sabha constituencies located in the Beed district. It covers the entire Kaij tehsil and parts of the Ambajogai and Beed tehsils of this district. This constituency is reserved for the candidates belonging to the Scheduled castes

Kaij is part of the Beed Lok Sabha constituency along with all other Vidhan Sabha segments in this district, namely Parli, Majalgaon, Georai, Beed and Ashti.

Members of Legislative Assembly
 1967: Sundarrao Solanke, Indian National Congress
 1990: Vimal Mundada, Bharatiya Janata Party
 1995: Vimal Mundada, Bharatiya Janata Party
 1999: Vimal Mundada, Nationalist Congress Party
 2004: Vimal Mundada, Nationalist Congress Party
 2009: Vimal Mundada, Nationalist Congress Party
 2012 : Prithviraj Sathe, Nationalist Congress Party [Bye-Election]
 2014 : Sangita Thombre, Bharatiya Janata Party
 2019 : Namita Mundada, Bharatiya Janata Party

References

Assembly constituencies of Maharashtra